Moto G4 is a line of Android smartphones manufactured by Motorola Mobility, a subsidiary of Lenovo. They are the successor to the third-generation Moto G, and were first released in Brazil and India on May 17, 2016, with the other markets following.

In comparison to the previous singular Moto G models, the G4 fragmented the line into three models, with the base model joined by the Moto G4 Play and the Moto G4 Plus with an upgraded camera and a fingerprint reader.

Specifications

The Moto G4's hardware design was refreshed featuring a "water repellent nano-coating" on the motherboard and a camera protrusion. However, unlike the Moto G3, the previous generation, the Moto G4 Plus does not feature IPX7 certification. The G4 was available in black and white-colored versions, with different rear-cover and accent-colors available for custom order via MotoMaker. The G4 has a removable backcover, removing which exposes SIM card slots and a MicroSD card slot. The G4 includes a 5.5-inch 1080p display, an octa-core Qualcomm Snapdragon 617 system-on-chip, and 2/3 GB of RAM. The Moto G4 includes either 16 or 32 GB of internal storage, expandable via MicroSD. It has a 13-megapixel rear-facing camera and a 5-megapixel front-facing camera. The Moto G4 also supports 802.11n Wi-Fi connectivity and an FM radio receiver.

The device shipped with Android 6.0.1 "Marshmallow". Motorola stated that the Moto G4 line would receive occasional security patches. On December 29, 2016, Motorola began rolling out an update to Android 7.0 "Nougat". In September 2017, Motorola stated that the Moto G4 Plus would receive an update to Android 8.1 "Oreo", although no estimated date was given. An Android 8.1 update was released in February 2019.

Alternative Android-ROMs

Official alternative Android-ROMs for all three G4 models were released by LineageOS, and their support originally was set to end with the final version 14.1 (corresponds to Android 7.1) on September 2018, though several new unofficial community releases were released afterwards.

On April 1, 2021 the G4 Play was added back to the officially supported list of devices, offering an update to Lineage 17.1 (Android 10).

A port of postmarketOS for the G4 Play exists under the code name motorola-harpia.

Models E4
The Moto G4 is available in a standard model, as well as the Moto G4 Play and Moto G4 Plus. The Play is a low-end model with reduced specifications, as well as an 8-megapixel camera and 720p display. The Plus model is a high-end version that features a 16-megapixel camera with dual-tone flash and infrared auto-focus, as well as an integrated fingerprint reader, up to 4 GB of RAM, and up to 64 GB of internal storage.

The G4 and G4 Play were also sold as part of Amazon.com's Prime Exclusive program, which offered a discounted version of the phone to Amazon Prime subscribers, subsidized by the display of personalized advertising on the lock screen. Due to this, the Prime Exclusive models of the device are ineligible for Motorola's bootloader unlocking program.

Model comparison

Reception

The Moto G4 was lauded as a top budget smartphone, with Android Central concluding that it "represents the ideal experience for an inexpensive Android phone and is a fantastic value." CNET called the G4 an "unbeatable bargain." Others noticed that, unlike the third-generation Moto G, the price of the G4 did not make it much cheaper than more powerful phones.

See also
Comparison of smartphones

References

Android (operating system) devices
Mobile phones introduced in 2016
Motorola smartphones